Fat Music Volume 5: Live Fat, Die Young is the fifth compilation album in the Fat Music series, released by the Fat Wreck Chords record label, in 2001. It was #187 on The Billboard 200. Its title is a parody of the Circle Jerks song "Live Fast Die Young".

Track listing
 "Down This Road" - Zero Down
 "Let Me Down" - No Use for a Name
 "Seattle Was a Riot" - Anti-Flag
 "Always" - Good Riddance
 "Flesh and Bones" - Fabulous Disaster
 "I Believe" - Sick of it All
 "Shut the Door" - Mad Caddies
 "Dear James" - Consumed
 "Novacain" - Strung Out
 "Hearing Aid" - Bracket
 "Prognosis: Fuck You" - Frenzal Rhomb
 "San Francisco Fat" - NOFX
 "Join the Ranks" - Rise Against
 "Alison's Disease" - Lagwagon
 "R.A.F." - Wizo
 "War Is Peace, Slavery Is Freedom, May All Your Interventions Be Humanitarian" - Propagandhi
 "Bad Place" - Tilt
 "Who's Asking" - Snuff
 "Hats Off To Larry" (Del Shannon cover) - Me First and the Gimme Gimmes
 "I Follow" - Swingin' Utters

See also
 Fat Wreck Chords compilations

References

Fat Music compilations
2001 compilation albums
Punk rock compilation albums
Hardcore punk compilation albums